Juárez Municipality may refer to:

Juárez Municipality, Chiapas - Municipal seat: Juárez, Chiapas
Juárez Municipality, Chihuahua
Juárez Municipality, Coahuila
Juárez Municipality, Michoacán
Juárez Municipality, Nuevo León - Municipal seat: Juárez, Nuevo León
See also
Benito Juárez Municipality (disambiguation)

Municipality name disambiguation pages